Aleksandr Alexandrovich Kovalyov (born 24 September 1986) is a Kazakhstani-born Uzbekistani professional footballer who last played for Metallurg Bekabad. He plays as a defender.

Career
Kovalyev signed a two-year contract with Bunyodkor in February 2010, after spending two seasons with Metalourg Bekabad.
Kovalyev has made one appearance for Bunyodkor in the 2010 AFC Champions League group stages.

References

External links 

1986 births
Living people
People from Taraz
Uzbekistani footballers
Association football defenders
Uzbekistani expatriate footballers
Expatriate footballers in Russia
Uzbekistani expatriate sportspeople in Russia
PFC Lokomotiv Tashkent players
FK Dinamo Samarqand players
FC Nasaf players
FC Bunyodkor players
FC Yenisey Krasnoyarsk players
Uzbekistan Super League players